Argoctenus is a genus of South Pacific long-legged sac spiders first described by Ludwig Carl Christian Koch in 1878. They are found in Australia, New Zealand, and New Guinea. They resemble wolf spiders except for the narrowed carapace and the eye arrangement.

Species
 it contains twelve species:
Argoctenus aureus (Hogg, 1911) — New Zealand
Argoctenus australianus (Karsch, 1878) — Australia (New South Wales)
Argoctenus bidentatus (Main, 1954) — Australia (Western Australia)
Argoctenus devisi Rainbow, 1898 — New Guinea
Argoctenus gracilis (Hickman, 1950) — Australia (South Australia)
Argoctenus hystriculus Simon, 1909 — Australia (Western Australia)
Argoctenus igneus L. Koch, 1878 — Australia (Western Australia)
Argoctenus nebulosus Simon, 1909 — Australia (Western Australia)
Argoctenus pectinatus Hogg, 1900 — Australia (Victoria)
Argoctenus pictus L. Koch, 1878 — Australia
Argoctenus vittatus (Simon, 1889) — Australia, New Caledonia
Argoctenus vittatus (Rainbow, 1920) — Australia (Lord Howe Is.)

References

Miturgidae
Araneomorphae genera
Spiders of Australia
Spiders of New Zealand